Through the Camera Eye is a videocassette/laserdisc release by the Canadian band Rush. It was released in 1985 by PolyGram Records. It contains promotional videos issued for the band's albums Moving Pictures (1981), Signals (1982) and Grace Under Pressure (1984). Absent from the collection were the videos for "Limelight" and the album version of "Tom Sawyer", both filmed at Le Studio (the same locale as the "Vital Signs" video). The live version of "Tom Sawyer" comes from the concert video Exit... Stage Left (1982). No DVD re-issue was released.

The concept of "The Camera Eye" is a literary device used by the author John Dos Passos in his trilogy USA.

Track listing
 "Distant Early Warning" - 5:31
 "Vital Signs" - 4:42
 "The Body Electric" - 5:08
 "Afterimage" - 5:11
 "Subdivisions" - 5:37
 "Tom Sawyer (Live)" - 4:43
 "The Enemy Within" - 4:22
 "Countdown" - 5:56
 Credits - 1:24

Personnel
Geddy Lee - Rickenbacker, Fender Jazz, Steinberger Bass, Minimoog Synthesizer and Moog Taurus Bass Pedals Oberheim OB-X, Oberheim OB-Xa, Oberheim DSX, Roland JP-8.
Neil Peart - Electric and Acoustic Drums and Percussion
Alex Lifeson - Fender Stratocaster, Gibson Les Paul, Gibson ES-355 Electric Guitars and Moog Taurus Bass Pedals

References

Rush (band) video albums
1985 video albums
Music video compilation albums
1985 compilation albums
Rush (band) compilation albums